Michela Wrong (born 1961) is a British journalist and author who spent six years as a foreign correspondent in Africa for Reuters, the BBC, and the Financial Times.

Career
Her debut book, In the Footsteps of Mr. Kurtz (2001), covers the time she spent in Zaire (now the Democratic Republic of the Congo) as it transitioned from the leadership of Mobutu Sese Seko to that of Laurent-Désiré Kabila. Her second book, I Didn't Do It For You: How the World Betrayed a Small African Nation (2004), discusses the nation of Eritrea and the role foreign nations have played in its history during the 20th century.

Her third book, It's Our Turn to Eat: The Story of a Kenyan Whistle-Blower (2009), tells the story of John Githongo, a Kenyan journalist and civil society activist, who in 2002 took on a senior anti-corruption role within the newly elected government of President Mwai Kibaki. In this role, Githongo uncovered widespread evidence of corruption (notably the Anglo-Leasing scandal) located high up within the Kibaki government. The book also discusses the role of ethnicity in Kenyan politics and is strongly critical of the response of the international aid community to Githongo's case.
The World Bank and the British government's aid department (the Department for International Development) come in for particularly strong criticism, though notable exceptions are also highlighted, such as Edward Clay, the then British High Commissioner to Kenya. It's Our Turn to Eat was censored in Kenya, leading to PEN Kenya president and activist Philo Ikonya acquiring books and bringing them into the country for wider distribution.

In 2009 she authored a novel, Borderlines, a legal thriller with a female lawyer protagonist. It focuses on a border dispute between two fictional states in the Horn of Africa, which the Financial Times reviewer thought resembled Ethiopia-Eritrea disputes in 1998-2000.

In 2021 she published Do Not Disturb: The Story of a Political Murder and an African Regime Gone Bad, about Rwanda, its president Paul Kagame, and the murder of Patrick Karegeya.

Award
She was awarded the 2010 James Cameron prize for journalism “that combined moral vision and professional integrity.”

Personal
She lives in London and is regularly interviewed by the BBC, Al Jazeera and Reuters on her areas of expertise. She has published opinion pieces and book reviews in The Observer, Guardian, Financial Times, New York Times, New Statesman, Spectator, Standpoint, Foreign Policy, and travel pieces for Condé Nast's Traveler magazine. She speaks fluent Italian and French.

She is a former literary director of the Miles Morland Foundation, an organisation that actively supports writers and literary projects across Africa.

Wrong is the granddaughter of Oxford historian Edward Murray Wrong and daughter of the nephrologist Oliver Wrong.

Works

References

External links
Michela Wrong's website
Going Too Far an interview with Wrong in Guernica Magazine

1961 births
Living people
British women journalists
British women non-fiction writers
British anti-corruption activists
British women novelists
20th-century British journalists
20th-century British women writers
21st-century British journalists
21st-century British novelists
21st-century British non-fiction writers
21st-century British women writers